Mansurwal Bet  is a village in Kapurthala district of Punjab State, India. The village is administrated by a Sarpanch, who is an elected representative.

Demography 
According to the report published by Census India in 2011, Mansurwal Bet has 193 houses with the total population of 908 persons of which 475 are male and 433 females. Literacy rate of  Mansurwal Bet is 69.82%, lower than the state average of 75.84%.  The population of children in the age group 0–6 years is 93 which is 10.24% of the total population. Child sex ratio is approximately 603, lower than the state average of 846.

Population data

References

External links
  Villages in Kapurthala
 Kapurthala Villages List

Villages in Kapurthala district